Saint-Priest-la-Marche is a commune in the Cher department in the Centre-Val de Loire region of France.

Geography
It is the southernmost commune of the department and borders the departments of Indre and Creuse.

Population

Sights
 The church of St. Priest, dating from the nineteenth century.
 The chateau of La Courcelle with its park and lake.
 A watermill.

See also
Communes of the Cher department

References

External links

Annuaire Mairie website 

Communes of Cher (department)